Amédée de Béjarry (30 June 1840 - 1 October 1916) was a French politician. He served as a member of the French Senate from 1886 to 1916, representing Vendée.

References

1840 births
1916 deaths
People from Vendée
French Senators of the Third Republic
Senators of Vendée